Below the Deadline is a 1921 American silent crime film directed by J.P. McGowan and starring Lillian Biron, Bert Sprotte and Robert Anderson.

Cast
 J.B. Warner as Joe Donovan
 Lillian Biron as Alice Elliot
 Bert Sprotte as Buck Elliot
 Robert Anderson as Hot Dog Heine

References

Bibliography
 Munden, Kenneth White. The American Film Institute Catalog of Motion Pictures Produced in the United States, Part 1. University of California Press, 1997.

External links
 

1920s American films
1921 films
1921 crime films
1920s English-language films
American silent feature films
American crime films
American black-and-white films
Films directed by J. P. McGowan